Dr. János Kerényi (born December 9, 1945) is a Hungarian jurist and politician, member of the National Assembly (MP) from Fidesz Bács-Kiskun County Regional List from 1998 to 2014, and from his party's national list since 2014.

He was a member of the Constitutional, Judicial and Standing Orders Committee since 2011. Therefore, he participated in the drawing up of the new constitution in 2011.

Personal life
He is married and has two children.

References

1945 births
Living people
Hungarian jurists
Fidesz politicians
Members of the National Assembly of Hungary (1998–2002)
Members of the National Assembly of Hungary (2002–2006)
Members of the National Assembly of Hungary (2006–2010)
Members of the National Assembly of Hungary (2010–2014)
Members of the National Assembly of Hungary (2014–2018)
Members of the National Assembly of Hungary (2018–2022)
Members of the National Assembly of Hungary (2022–2026)
People from Kiskunhalas